Dubravka or Dúbravka may refer to:

Places 
 Dúbravka, Bratislava, a district of Bratislava, Slovakia
 Dubravka, Croatia, a village in Konavle, Croatia
 Dúbravka, Michalovce, a village in the Michalovce District, Slovakia

Other 
 Dubravka (drama), a 17th-century pastoral play by Ivan Gundulić
 Dubravka, a pastorale for choir and orchestra, composed by Jakov Gotovac
 HSC Dubravka, a high speed passenger craft operated by Jadrolinija

People with name Dubravka

Given name
 Dubravka Mijatović, Serbian actress
 Dubravka Šuica, Croatian politician
 Dubravka Tomšič Srebotnjak, Slovenian pianist and music teacher
 Dubravka Ugrešić, Croatian writer
 Dubravka Vukotić, Montenegrin actress
 Dubravka Zubović, opera singer from Croatia
 Dubravka Sekulić, Serbian author, architect and professor
 Dubravka Jusić, Croatian pop star and daughter of Đelo Jusić

Surname
 Martin Dúbravka, Slovak football goalkeeper

See also
 
 Dubravko, masculine version
 Doubravka, a Czech variant
 Dúbravka (disambiguation), a Slovak variant
 Dąbrówka (disambiguation), a Polish variant
 Dubrava (disambiguation)